Juvenal Amarijo (November 27, 1923 – October 30, 2009) was a Brazilian football player. He was born in Santa Vitória do Palmar, Brazil.

Career
Juvenal Amarijo started his career with Cruzeiro-RS, joining Flamengo in 1949, then Palmeiras in 1951, moving to Bahia in 1954 then retiring in 1959 while defending Ypiranga-BA.

He played for the Brazil in the 1950 FIFA World Cup, and was the last surviving Brazilian player from the final match of the tournament upon his death on October 30, 2009, at age 85, in the city of Salvador, in Bahia, Brazil, due to respiratory failure.

References

External links

1923 births
2009 deaths
Brazilian footballers
Sportspeople from Rio Grande do Sul
Brazil international footballers
1950 FIFA World Cup players
Esporte Clube Cruzeiro players
CR Flamengo footballers
Sociedade Esportiva Palmeiras players
Esporte Clube Bahia players
Association football defenders